Lost Girls is the fifth studio album by English singer-songwriter Natasha Khan, known professionally as Bat for Lashes. It was released on 6 September 2019 through AWAL. It is Khan's follow up to 2016's The Bride. The lead single "Kids in the Dark" was released on 10 June 2019.

Khan has cited 1980s music and cinema as an inspiration for the record, citing artists such as Bananarama, Cyndi Lauper and The Blue Nile as well as film composer John Williams in an interview with The Line of Best Fit.

Promotion
Khan teased a release on 10 June 2019 through early June, posting short videos to her social media accounts. One featured a snippet of music and a number for a hotline on a poster, which, when dialled, asked callers to leave a message about a lost girl named Nikki. Khan formally announced the album and release of the lead single on 10 June.

Critical reception

Lost Girls was met with generally favorable reviews from critics. At Metacritic, which assigns a weighted average rating out of 100 to reviews from mainstream publications, this release received an average score of 76, based on 22 reviews.

Accolades

Track listing
Adapted from Apple Music.

Charts

References

2019 albums
Bat for Lashes albums
Albums produced by MNEK
Albums produced by Jennifer Decilveo